The Parrucë Mosque is the latest mosque in Shkodër City, Shkodër County, Albania. It is a reconstructed mosque from the original, built in 1937.

History
The original Parruca Mosque had been constructed in 1937 and was demolished on March 23, 1967, by the communist regime. The recononstruction was completed in 2006 in its original Ottoman style with funding from Haxhi Sait Jakup Fishta. Exactly 40 years after the destruction of the old mosque, the Parruca Mosque was consecrated on March 23, 2007. The interior is decorated with bright color paintings.

See also
 Islam in Albania

References 

Mosques in Shkodër
Mosques completed in 2006
Mosques destroyed by communists
Rebuilt buildings and structures
Tourist attractions in Shkodër County
21st-century mosques